Kanalia, or Kanalion is a Greek town close to the city of Corfu but administratively it belongs to the municipality of Achilleion.

Population

References 

Populated places in Corfu (regional unit)